Still Thinking About You is the fourth studio album by the English band Scouting for Girls. It was released in the United Kingdom on 16 October 2015. The album includes the new singles "Life's Too Short" & "Christmas in the Air Tonight" .

Singles
 "Life's Too Short" was released as the Lead single from the album on 21 August 2015.
 "Christmas in the Air (Tonight)" was released as the second single from the album on 20 November 2015.
 "Home" was the third single released from the album on 18 March 2016.

Track listing

Life's Too Short    - 2:52
Still Thinking About You    - 3:29
Castles    - 4:03
Home    - 2:54
My Vow    - 3:39
Black and Blue    - 3:43
Three Words Eight Letters    - 3:18
Bad Superman    - 3:12
Best Laid Plans    - 1:45
Thank You and Goodnight    - 3:26
Christmas in the Air (Tonight)    - 3:11

itunes edition bonus tracks

Footsteps    - 3:37
5Am    - 3:25
The VW Campervan Summer Song    - 3:15
Bad Superman (acoustic)    - 3:12
Life's Too Short (acoustic)    - 2:57

Charts

Personnel 

 Roy Stride – guitar, piano, lead vocals
 Greg Churchouse – bass, backing vocals
 Pete Ellard – drums, percussion, backing vocals

References

2015 albums
Scouting for Girls albums
Albums produced by Jon Maguire